Joseph Johnson of Liverpool, England, was a highly respected and successful British master clock, watch and chronometer maker.

He was a nonconformist who was married to Mary Bryers and who worked in Liverpool from 1795 to about 1827. The earliest specific date (from the hallmark in the silver case) known for a watch of his is 1811. He is known to have worked from a factory at 25 Church Street, although census records indicate that his residence was elsewhere in the same street (No. 26 and later (1841 census) No. 49); only No. 25 is named on the movements of his watches. After his death, on 2 March 1827, his wife Mary, son Joseph Johnson and grandsons Joseph Johnson Cashen and Joseph Johnson Norris continued his work until at least 1857.
His watches are of high quality and were usually provided with precious metal cases, often in gold; these have often been lost in the course of time, so that many Johnson watches now survive only as uncased movements. Joseph Johnson had a preference for using fully jewelled watch movements. He is credited with inventing several design improvements to the pocket watch and watch movement. His watches were commonly used on U.S. railroads, before the establishment of the U.S. watch industry. In 1816 the United States government chose a chronometer signed by Johnson, No. 508, for a presentation to Commodore Oliver H. Perry in recognition of his action against the British on Lake Erie.

Gallery

References

Notes

Bibliography
 G. H. Baillie, Watchmakers And Clockmakers Of The World 2nd Edition, Pub Nag Press 1947
 Brian Loomes, Lancashire Clocks and Clockmakers, Pub David & Charles 1975 
 Brian Loomes, Watchmakers & Clockmakers Of The World Vol 2 (2nd Edition), Pub NAG Press 1989 
 Martha Shugart, Complete price guide to watches 2001, Pub Cooksey Shugart Publications 2001 
 NAWCC Bulletin, Pub National Association Watch & Clock Collectors

1780 births
1851 deaths
English watchmakers (people)
English clockmakers
English inventors
People from Everton